The Huata District is the smallest of the 10 districts of the Huaylas Province in the Ancash Region of Peru. The capital of the district is the village of Huata.

History
The district was founded on January 2, 1857.

Location
The district is located in the central part of the province at an elevation of 2,736m in the black mountains, neighboring district is the Caraz district in which the provinces capital Caraz is located, 17 km from the village of Huata.

Political division
The Huata District is divided into 1 village, 6 hamlets and 40:

Villages
Huata

Hamlets
Cancho
Inchapampa
Parcap
Racracallan
Ranca
Tambillo

Anexos
Caulla
Cashapuro
Animas
Molino
Tunanpuquio
Shaquipampa
Tranca
Huerco
Pichipuquio
Puca Rumi
Mosqueta
Mandahuas
Colcash
Anascallan (Choccho)
Rachinac
Higos
Cotu
Cocha Cocha
Lauricocha
La Fronda
Ampicallan
Zanja
Cahu Nuevo
Pato Raca
Cucuri
Ancaranac
Pichi Alta
Cedro
Quespac
Huachcuyoc
Nauya
Yuracpacha
Alalacpampa
Pacayo (Pucllanca)
Maraypampa
Malambo
Ocuyoc
Rayan
Huancayoc
Ache

Capital
The capital of the Huata district is the city of Huata.

Climate
The district has a temperate and dry climate with a temperature varying from 12 to 19 degrees Celsius.

Traditional festivals
VIRGEN DEL ASUNCION on August 15
FIESTA DEL MILAGRO on September 11
VIRGEN DE LAS MERCEDES on September 24
FIESTA DE ANIVERSARIO DE CREACION POLITICA on January 2

References

External links
  Official web site of the Huaylas province

1857 establishments in Peru
Districts of the Huaylas Province
Districts of the Ancash Region